Michele Coppolillo (born 17 July 1967) is an Italian racing cyclist. He rode in nine editions of the Giro d'Italia, one Tour de France and two editions of the Vuelta a España.

Major results

1994
 2nd Overall Settimana Internazionale di Coppi e Bartali
1995
 4th Züri-Metzgete
 5th Overall Tirreno–Adriatico
1996
 1st Stage 4 Tour Méditerranéen
 2nd Overall Critérium International
 3rd Trofeo Laigueglia
 3rd Tour de Berne
 3rd Milan–San Remo
 4th Overall Tirreno–Adriatico
1997
 1st Trofeo Pantalica

References

External links
 

1967 births
Living people
Italian male cyclists
Place of birth missing (living people)
Sportspeople from Cosenza
Cyclists from Calabria